XIC can stand for:
 Examination in Chief
 The number of the beast or 616
 In Eastern Greek XIC is chi-iota-sigma, or 616 (number)
 X-inactivation center, a part of female X chromosome
 Xichang Qingshan Airport, which has IATA code of "XIC"
 Extracted Ion Chromatogram, a representation of data in hyphenated mass spectrometry/chromatography